Life Story may refer to:
 Life Story (TV series), a 2014 British natural history television series
 Life Story (film), a 1987 TV film dramatisation of the discovery of the structure of DNA
 Life Story (album), the 2000 debut album by Black Rob
 Life story work, a social work psychological intervention
 "Life-Story", a widely anthologized short story from Lost in the Funhouse by John Barth
 "Life Story" (song), a 1999 song by Angie Stone
"Life Story", a song by Barbra Streisand from the album Guilty